Svi za mnom! (Everybody, follow me!) is the second album by the Serbian alternative rock band Disciplina Kičme, released by the Slovenian record label Helidon in 1986, and reissued on CD by the record label in 1997. A remastered version of the album was rereleased on CD on the compilation album Ove ruke nisu male... 2 in 2005.

Track listing 
All music and lyrics by Zeleni Zub, except track 1, written by YU grupa.

Personnel

The band 
 Koja (Dušan Kojić) — bass, vocals
 Žika (Srđan Todorović) — drums
 Kele (Nenad Krasavac) — drums
 Dedža — trumpet, vocals
 Zerkman (Zoran Erkman) — trumpet, vocals

Additional personnel 
 Duca — photography
 S. Milojković — photography
 Zeleni Zub (Dušan Kojić) — producer, written by
 Vlada Negovanović — recorded by
 Darko M. (Darko Milojković) — vocals on track 1
 Banana (Branislav Petrović) — vocals on track 1
 Boye — vocals on track 8

Legacy
In 2015, the Svi za mnom! album cover was ranked 95th on the list of 100 Greatest Album Covers of Yugoslav Rock published by web magazine Balkanrock.

References 

 EX YU ROCK enciklopedija 1960-2006, Janjatović Petar; 
 Svi za mnom at Discogs

1983 albums
Serbian-language albums
Disciplina Kičme albums